Best of Traffic is a compilation album by the band Traffic, released in 1969.

The U.S. LP version of the compilation had a different cover design and replaced "Smiling Phases" with "You Can All Join In".

Track listing
 "Paper Sun" (Steve Winwood, Jim Capaldi)
 "Heaven Is in Your Mind" (Capaldi, Winwood, Chris Wood)
 "No Face, No Name, No Number" (Winwood, Capaldi)
 "Coloured Rain" (Winwood, Capaldi, Wood)
 "Smiling Phases"  (Winwood, Capaldi, Wood)
 "Hole in My Shoe" (Dave Mason)
 "Medicated Goo" (Winwood, Jimmy Miller)
 "40,000 Headmen" (Winwood, Capaldi)
 "Feelin' Alright" (Mason)
 "Shanghai Noodle Factory"  (Winwood, Capaldi, Wood, Mason, Miller, Larry Fallon)
 "Dear Mr. Fantasy"  (Winwood, Capaldi, Wood)

Personnel
Jim Capaldi – drums, percussion, backing vocals, lead vocal on "Heaven Is in Your Mind"
Dave Mason – bass, guitar, sitar, mellotron, backing vocals, lead vocals on "Hole in My Shoe" and "Feelin' Alright"
Steve Winwood – lead vocals (except on "Hole in My Shoe" and "Feelin' Alright"), organ, piano, bass, guitar, percussion, harpsichord, backing vocals on "Hole in My Shoe" and "Feelin' Alright"
Chris Wood – flute, saxophone, organ, percussion, backing vocals

Charts

References

1969 greatest hits albums
Traffic (band) albums
Albums produced by Jimmy Miller